Elgeta is a town located in the province of Gipuzkoa, in the autonomous community of Basque Country, northern Spain.

References

External links
Official website 
ELGETA at the Bernardo Estornés Lasa - Auñamendi Encyclopedia (Euskomedia Fundazioa) 

Municipalities in Gipuzkoa